Hawthorne/Lennox station is a below-grade light rail station on the C Line of the Los Angeles Metro Rail system. It is located in the median of Interstate 105 (Century Freeway), below Hawthorne Boulevard, after which the station is named along with the Lennox community where it is located. The station is also close to the city of Hawthorne.

The original name for the station was Hawthorne Blvd/I-105, but was later simplified and its location in Lennox clarified, with a change to Hawthorne/Lennox.

Hawthorne/Lennox station provides access to SoFi Stadium, Kia Forum, YouTube Theater, and the future Intuit Dome via Metro's shuttles.

Service

Station layout

Hours and frequency

Connections 
, the following connections are available:
 Los Angeles Metro Bus: , 
 the Link: Lennox
 SoFi Stadium Shuttle

References 

C Line (Los Angeles Metro) stations
Railway stations in the United States opened in 1995
Hawthorne, California
1995 establishments in California